Balinese is a Unicode block containing characters of Balinese script for the Balinese language. Balinese language is mainly spoken on the island of Bali, Indonesia.

Block

History
The following Unicode-related documents record the purpose and process of defining specific characters in the Balinese block:

See also 
 Javanese (Unicode block)
 Sundanese (Unicode block)

References 

Unicode blocks